James Clunie (20 March 1889 – 25 February 1974) was a British Labour Party politician.

Born in Lower Largo, Clunie worked as a house painter and decorator.  He joined the Scottish Painters' Society, serving on its executive, and also came to chair Dunfermline Trades Council.  From 1933 until 1950, he served on Dunfermline Town Council.  In 1950, he was elected as Member of Parliament (MP) for Dunfermline Burghs, serving until his retirement in 1959.

Works
 (1920) The First Principles of Working Class Education, Glasgow: Socialist Labour Press
 (1954) Labour is my Faith: The autobiography of a house painter, Dunfermline: A Romanes & Son

References

External links 
 

1889 births
1974 deaths
Scottish Labour MPs
Members of the Parliament of the United Kingdom for Scottish constituencies
UK MPs 1950–1951
UK MPs 1951–1955
UK MPs 1955–1959